Budućnost means "the future" in many Slavic languages, and it may also refer to:

SD Budućnost Podgorica, a sports society from Podgorica, Montenegro
 KK Budućnost Podgorica, a professional basketball club

FK Budućnost may refer to:
 FK Budućnost Banatski Dvor, defunct Serbian football club that was based in Banatski Dvor, in 2006 it merged with FK Proleter Zrenjanin to form FK Banat Zrenjanin
 FK Budućnost Banovići, Bosnian football club based in Banovići
 FK Budućnost Dobanovci, Serbian football club based in the Belgrade suburb of Dobanovci
 FK Budućnost Podgorica, Montenegrin football club based in Podgorica
 FK Budućnost Valjevo, Serbian football club based in Valjevo